The 1917 Denver Pioneers football team represented the University of Denver as a member of the Rocky Mountain Conference (RMC) during the 1917 college football season. In their third season under head coach John Fike, the Pioneers compiled a perfect 9–0 record (6–0 against conference opponents), shared the RMC championship with Utah Agricultural, and outscored opponents by a total of 226 to 45.

At the end of the season, both Denver and Utah Agricultural were undefeated against RMC opponents. A game between the two teams was proposed to determine an undisputed conference champion, but Denver's faculty ruled against the game. Denver officials claimed the title and asserted that the Utah Aggies "have a right to claim nothing more than a tie for the honors."

The 1917 team compiled the only perfect season in the program's history.

Schedule

References

Denver
Denver Pioneers football seasons
Rocky Mountain Athletic Conference football champion seasons
College football undefeated seasons
Denver Pioneers football